Fowlmere Airfield  is a small airfield located  northeast of Royston, Hertfordshire and  southwest of Cambridge, Cambridgeshire, England. It was previously a Royal Air Force satellite station, RAF Fowlmere.

History

First World War
Flying at Fowlmere originated in 1918 when the airfield was used by Royal Air Force
 No. 124 Squadron RAF
 No. 125 Squadron RAF
 No. 126 Squadron RAF

Flying cadets of the Air Service, United States Army were trained at Fowlmere by RAF instructors, prior to their deployment to the Western Front in France.   After the First World War ended, the hangars were all demolished along with the assorted buildings by 1923.

Second World War

Royal Air Force use 

With the eruption of the Second World War, Fowlmere was intended to be a satellite for RAF Fighter Command at nearby RAF Duxford and was used by 19 Squadron with Supermarine Spitfires 
along with:
 No. 2 Squadron RAF.
 No. 15 Squadron RAF.
 No. 16 Squadron RAF.
 No. 21 Squadron RAF.
 No. 111 Squadron RAF. 
 No. 133 (Eagle) Squadron RAF. 
 No. 154 Squadron RAF. 
 No. 167 Squadron RAF.
 No. 174 Squadron RAF.
 No. 264 Squadron RAF.
 No. 411 (Canadian) Squadron RAF. 
 No. 421 (Canadian) Squadron RAF.
 No. 655 Squadron RAF.

United States Army Air Forces use 

When the airfield was turned over to the USAAF, Fowlmere was expanded to meet the requirements of a complete fighter group.  The airfield was assigned USAAF designation Station 378  It was allocated to the United States Army Air Forces Eighth Air Force fighter command.

USAAF Station Units assigned to RAF Fowlmere were: 
 314th Service Group
 467th Service Squadron; HHS 314th Service Group
 331st Service Group
 464th and 465th Service Squadrons; HHS 331s Service Group
 18th Weather Squadron
 72nd Station Complement Squadron
 861st Engineer Aviation Battalion
 1178th Quartermaster Company
 1786th Ordnance Supply & Maintenance Company
 989th Military Police Company
 2120th Engineer Fire Fighting Platoon

The 339th Fighter Group arrived at Fowlmere from Rice AAF, California on 4 April 1944. The group was under the command of the 66th Fighter Wing of the VIII Fighter Command. Aircraft of the group were identified by a red/white chequerboard pattern.

Postwar Royal Air Force use
With the departure of the Americans, Fowlmere was used briefly by No. 11 Group RAF RAF Fighter Command until January 1946 then closed and placed into care and maintenance status. It was eventually sold back to local farmers in 1957. With the end of RAF control, the concreted areas and buildings of Fowlmere airfield were largely ground into aggregate and sold for local construction projects.

Current use

The airfield is in active use, with new management as of November 2020. It is home to the British Aerobatic Academy and the Modern Air flying club. There is a grass runway 07/25, with PPR (Prior Permission Required) necessary to land.

Fowlmere Airfield Museum is on-site, open one Sunday per month.

See also

List of former Royal Air Force stations

References

Citations

Bibliography

 Freeman, Roger A. (1978) Airfields of the Eighth: Then and Now. After the Battle 
 Freeman, Roger A. (1991) The Mighty Eighth: The Colour Record. Cassell & Co. 
 Maurer, Maurer (1983). Air Force Combat Units Of World War II. Maxwell AFB, Alabama: Office of Air Force History. .
 USAAS-USAAC-USAAF-USAF Aircraft Serial Numbers--1908 to present 
 mighty8thaf.preller.us Fowlmere
 339th Fighter Group on www.littlefriends.co.uk

External links
Fowlmere Airfield (current website)
British Aerobatic Academy
Modern Air flying club
Fowlmere Airfield Museum

Airfields of the VIII Fighter Command in the United Kingdom
Royal Air Force stations in Cambridgeshire
Royal Air Force stations of World War II in the United Kingdom
World War I airfields
World War I sites in England
Airfield